Ringerike, Asker og Bærum District Court is a district court located in Viken county, Norway. This court is based at two different courthouses which are located in Hønefoss and Sandvika. The court serves central part of the county, just west of Oslo. This court has jurisdiction across six municipalities. The court in Hønefoss accepts cases from the municipalities of Hole, Jevnaker, Lunner, and Ringerike. The court in Sandvika accepts cases from the municipalities of Asker and Bærum. The court is subordinate to the Borgarting Court of Appeal.

The court is led by a chief judge and several other judges. The court is a court of first instance. Its judicial duties are mainly to settle criminal cases and to resolve civil litigation as well as bankruptcy. The administration and registration tasks of the court include death registration, issuing certain certificates, performing duties of a notary public, and officiating civil wedding ceremonies. Cases from this court are heard by a combination of professional judges and lay judges.

History
This court was established on 26 April 2021 after the old Asker og Bærum District Court and Ringerike District Court were merged into one court. The new district court system continues to use the courthouses from the predecessor courts.

References

District courts of Norway
2021 establishments in Norway
Organisations based in Asker
Organisations based in Bærum
Organisations based in Ringerike (municipality)